The Sixth Form College Farnborough is a sixth form college situated in Farnborough, Hampshire, England. It caters for around 3,915 students and admission is mostly from schools in the local areas of Surrey, Hampshire and Berkshire. The college is often referred to as 'Farnborough Sixth' to differentiate it from Farnborough College of Technology.

Awards
In 2006, the college ranked third place in the school league table for Hampshire, achieving a higher ranking for A-Level results than several highly regarded independent and private schools in the area.

In 2007, the college was rated 'Outstanding' by Her Majesty’s Chief Inspector, and it retains Beacon Status as one of the country’s top sixth form colleges. The college was rated 'Outstanding' again in 2021.

In 2010, the college was one of the first colleges nationwide to gain the 'NFER Research-Engaged Award'.

In 2012, Prince Philip presented the college with one of the first Duke of Edinburgh Award Operating Licences, making the college a Directly Licensed Centre in the Duke of Edinburgh Award network.

The college has also attained awards including the 'Investors in People', 'Investors in Careers', 'Positive about Disabled People' and 'Fairtrade' awards.

History
The college was founded as the Farnborough Grammar School in September 1936, when the Aldershot County High School outgrew its premises and the boys were relocated to Farnborough.

The Sixth Form College was created from 1974 to 1978, gradually enlarging as the number of Grammar School pupils reduced. Since being incorporated as a sixth form college in 1992, it has grown fast from 1,180 full-time students in 1992 to now having over 3000.

Dr John J Guy was the principal from 1992 to 2010. He served on a number of government committees, including the Tomlinson Committee on 14-19 reform, and in 2001 was awarded the OBE for services to education.

He was succeeded as principal in September 2010 by the college's deputy principal, Simon Jarvis.

In February 2018, it was announced that Catherine Cole, Deputy Principal (Student Services), would succeed Simon Jarvis when he stepped down as Principal (but would continue as CEO of the Prospect Trust) in September 2018.

College facilities

The college has undergone a major building programme costing over £15 million. The first project was the Prospect Theatre and performing arts suite, which was opened by Prince Edward, Earl of Wessex in 2000. Also, The Dame Kelly Holmes Sports Centre was opened on 25 April 2007 by the double Olympic gold medallist. The developments have also seen the construction of a brand new quad built in the centre of the college, and the Whitehouse Building which boasts an e-Assessment Centre - an IT centre for students to use. The latest building is the John Guy Building, a new block which replaced the former 1960s Scola block. The John Guy Building was opened by the Secretary of State for Education, Michael Gove in 2010 and houses the physics, computing, arts and photographic departments. It was given a BREEAM 'Excellent' rating. The college has three cafeterias: Café Direct, TimeOut and Shades. The college also has two large fields which are used for sports and recreational purposes. The Simon Jarvis lecture theatre attached to the Ranson building, was opened in September 2018.

Student Association 
Every March, students elect a President and Vice President, via Single Transferable Vote, whom together lead the otherwise appointed committee to organise student affairs and social activities in and outside of the college, as well as charity events. The President and Vice President sit on the Academy Quality Council.

In October 2007, the 2007/2008 Student Association broke the college record, which had been set the previous year, for the most money raised in a single college day; the £1,800 that was raised eventually went to a variety of gene therapy charities through the 'Jeans for Genes' initiative. In 2007 the school undertook a massive project for Red Nose Day in which over a thousand students took to the field holding red paper above their heads, first making the shape of a nose and then a 6 (the logo of the college), filmed by the BBC from a helicopter.

The 2011/2012 Student Association raised over £20,000 for a variety of local charities over the academic year, the highest raised for charity by the college so far. The 2012/2013 Student Association reestablished the Student College Magazine and have forged links with other local colleges through a Battle of the Bands Competition.

Enrichment 

The college has established links with Presbyterian Secondary Technical School, Aburi, Ghana. This project is called the Ghana Link and it aims to broaden students from both schools' horizons and develop a two way partnership that would be of benefit to both parties.

The college has a dedicated Film Production enrichment program which produces commercial and non-commercial films for outside companies and student film festivals.

In March 2000, Prince Edward opened the new £2.5 million Performing Arts Centre incorporating the modern 300-seat Prospect Theatre and teaching suites for music, dance and drama. One of the music enrichments making use of this facility is the biannual college Opera Project, where full-scale operas are performed by students. In 2006, the college staged The Marriage of Figaro by Mozart.  A performance of Engelbert Humperdinck's Hansel and Gretel took place in July 2008.

CristalWeb 
CristalWeb is the college's web-based   management information system that allows students and staff to see the data that the college holds on them. It is extensively used within the college, to pass messages from staff to students, take registers of classes, submit absence reasons, look up exam results, amend certificates of enrichment, and edit students' personal information. Students also have access Google Sites created by each subject; this is referred to as the Study Directory. Homework is assigned through Google Classroom. The CristalWeb system has been operating since mid-2004.

Notable alumni
 Victoria Atkin, former Hollyoaks actress
Grace Blakeley, journalist
Nicholas Hoult, actor
Jessica Castles, gymnast

Farnborough Grammar School
 Stephen Timms, government minister, Labour MP since 1997 for East Ham and from 1994-7 for Newham North East
 Michael Whelan, Professor of Microscopy of Materials from 1992-7 at the Department of Materials, University of Oxford
 Alan Clayson, musician and author

References

External links
 Official website
 EduBase

Learning and Skills Beacons
Sixth form colleges in Hampshire
Educational institutions established in 1936
Sixth Form College
1936 establishments in England